Dance of Fire is the third album released by the Azeri jazz artist Aziza Mustafa Zadeh. It was released in 1995.

Recording and Music
The album was recorded at Sony Music Studios in New York during January and February 1995. It was produced by Reinhard Karwatky. The material "combines be-bop-derived jazz with elements [of] Azerbaijan folk music and Mugham." All of the music was composed and arranged by Zadeh.

Reception

The AllMusic reviewer wrote that the pianist's "playing is graceful and fluid, eclipsing her super-star backup musicians." The reviewer for BBC Music Magazine commented: "here is a new slant on the jazz vocal, just when you thought everything had been said on the subject".

Track listing
 "Boomerang" – 4:24
 "Dance of Fire" – 6:02
 "Sheherezadeh" – 2:52
 "Aspiration" – 2:23
 "Bana Bana Gel (Bad Girl)" – 12:32
 "Shadow" – 5:54
 "Carnival" – 7:29
 "Passion" – 7:10
 "Spanish Picture" – 9:00
 "To Be Continued" – 5:59
 "Father" – 5:57

Personnel
 Aziza Mustafa Zadeh – piano, vocals
 Al Di Meola – acoustic guitar
 Bill Evans – soprano sax, tenor sax
 Stanley Clarke – acoustic bass guitar, electric bass guitar
 Kai E. Karpeh De Camargo – 5-string electric bass guitar
 Omar Hakim – drums

References

1995 albums
Aziza Mustafa Zadeh albums
Columbia Records albums